Gaston Curbelo (born April 8, 1976) is a French former football striker, who played for AS Nancy in the Ligue 1.

Gaston Curbelo was born in Nancy and is the son of 1970s AS Nancy player Carlos Curbelo. His family relocated to Nice where Gaston signed for OGC Nice as a youngster. The family moved again, back to Uruguay, where he signed for Huracán Buceo.

However, it was back in Nancy that Curbelo was to begin his professional career in earnest.  Signing in 2000 for the Ligue 2 club, he debuted in the 1–0 defeat at FC Gueugnon on March 10, 2002.

Curbelo became a regular for Nancy at the end of that season and, apart from an injury which ruled him out of a large portion of Nancy's first season back in Ligue 1, has played regularly for the club since.

External links
 

1976 births
Living people
Sportspeople from Nancy, France
French people of Uruguayan descent
French footballers
Ligue 1 players
AS Nancy Lorraine players
Association football forwards
Footballers from Grand Est
Footballers from Nice